Bothriospermum is a genus of flowering plants belonging to the family Boraginaceae.

Its native range is Tropical and Subtropical Asia to Mongolia.

Species:

Bothriospermum chinense 
Bothriospermum hispidissimum 
Bothriospermum kusnetzowii 
Bothriospermum longistylum 
Bothriospermum secundum 
Bothriospermum zeylanicum

References

Boraginaceae
Boraginaceae genera
Taxa named by Alexander von Bunge